"I Just Cut Myself" is a song recorded by American country music artist Ronnie McDowell.  It was released in May 1982 as the first single from the album Love to Burn.  The song reached #11 on the Billboard Hot Country Singles & Tracks chart.  The song was written by Chance Jones and Mike Lantrip.

Chart performance

References

1982 singles
1982 songs
Ronnie McDowell songs
Song recordings produced by Buddy Killen
Epic Records singles